Sons of Adventure is a 1948 American Western film directed by Yakima Canutt, written by Franklin Adreon and Sol Shor, and starring Lynne Roberts, Russell Hayden, Gordon Jones, Grant Withers, George Chandler and Roy Barcroft. It was released on September 1, 1948 by Republic Pictures.

Plot

Cast    
Lynne Roberts as Jean
Russell Hayden as Steve Malone
Gordon Jones as Andy Baldwin
Grant Withers as J.L. Sterling
George Chandler as Billy Wilkes 
Roy Barcroft as Leslie Bennett 
John Newland as Peter Winslow 
Stephanie Bachelor as Laura Gifford
John Holland as Paul Kenyon
Gil Frye as Sam Hodges 
Richard Irving as Eddie
Joan Blair as Glenda
John Crawford as George Norton
Keith Richards as Harry
James Dale as Whitey

References

External links 
 

1948 films
American Western (genre) films
1948 Western (genre) films
Republic Pictures films
American black-and-white films
Films directed by Yakima Canutt
1940s English-language films
1940s American films